The DGM Barbados Open was a senior (over 50s) men's professional golf tournament played on the Caribbean island state of Barbados, played annually from 2000 to 2009. It was an early season event on the European Senior Tour and generally the only regular event on the tour that took place in the Americas. It was hosted by the Royal Westmoreland Golf Club, Saint James, Barbados.

Winners

External links
Coverage on the European Senior Tour's official site 
Royal Westmoreland Estate and Championship Golf Course

Former European Senior Tour events
Golf tournaments in Barbados
Recurring sporting events established in 2000
Recurring sporting events disestablished in 2009
Defunct sports competitions in Barbados